Valery Yuryevich Bocherov (born 10 August 2000) is a Belarusian professional footballer who plays for BATE Borisov.

Honours
BATE Borisov
Belarusian Cup winner: 2020–21
Belarusian Super Cup winner: 2022

References

External links 
 
 

2000 births
Living people
Belarusian footballers
Association football midfielders
Belarus international footballers
FC BATE Borisov players
FC Smolevichi players
FC Slutsk players